HTS TENTIQ is a German company specialising in the development and manufacture of temporary buildings and marquees. Its head office and production facility are located in Kefenrod, Germany.

History
HTS TENTIQ was established in 2001 in Kefenrod, Germany.

Between 2002 and 2003 the strategic sales offices opened in the Great Britain, France and the Middle East and grew further in 2006 with further offices being opened in Singapore and Russia in 2006 and in India in 2007.

In 2013 the company acquired the shares in the Huaye Tent (Kunshan) Co. Ltd in China.

In 2014 the affiliated company HTS Industriebau was established specializing in the design and manufacture of quickly erectable steel framed structures.

Today HTS TENTIQ is considered a leading force in the aluminum temporary structures industry, supplying one of the largest and most diverse selections of temporary and semi-permanent event tents and temporary structures to private and public sectors worldwide.

The company currently employs more than 260 highly qualified and trained employees, mainly at the Kefenrod site, the majority of whom have been with HTS TENTIQ from the outset. This includes a global sales team of more than 50 employees who are strategically distributed in all regions worldwide and can provide on-site support, delivery, distribution and assembly if required..

Activity
In 2009, the company designed the 3-story temporary Pit Lane Pavilion building for the CLIPSAL 500 event held in South Australia. The structure had the following features: the ground level consisted of 36 Pit Lane garages, the ground floor accommodated various operational and medical offices, and the first and second floors incorporated numerous different sized hospitality suits, TV and radio broadcasting suites, race control, media centre and others.

Later in 2009 the company launched HTS Industrial, a specialist division providing the hire and sale of industrial temporary buildings and warehouses direct to end user customers. The division now has sales and distribution warehouses in Europe, Australia and the United States.

In 2010 a new carbon/alloy hybrid frame structure system ‘Carbon-Hybrid’ was officially launched and patented, significantly reducing the volume and weight of structures with the help of carbon inserts. In the same year HTS Avantgarde external glass and solid walling system was patented.

In 2012 an order with the Russian Federation Defence Ministry established a new Military division specialising in the design, manufacture and supply of turnkey field camps and individual military tents and shelters.

In 2013 the company won a tender costing 27.6 million US dollars for the construction of a new international airport terminal building in Nairobi (Kenya), after a fire destroyed the original building. The new terminal enabled the airport to increase the airport's capacity to 7.5 million people per year.

In 2015 the company carried out a project on the construction of several refugee camps in Germany, and in 2016 during the Tent Expo’16 exhibition a contract was made with Italy for the refugee field camp solutions.

In July 2016, the company acquired a project for a structure that would be used at Chornomorets Stadium in Odessa for the 2017 Eurovision Song Contest. However, on 9 September it was announced that the Eurovision Song Contest would be held in Kyiv in the International Exhibition Centre.

The company also designed, manufactured and installed the exhibition buildings for Sokolniki Park. In 2008 a semi-permanent two-storey structure was built with a total area of 3,650 m2.

The company regularly supplies hospitality structures to accommodate spectators during race events for Audi, Porsche, BMW, Hankook and other car manufacturers.

As reported by HTS TENTIQ, the company's turnover in 2012 amounted to 120 million euros.

The company has won IFAI and IFEA awards.

References

External links
 Stark machen für bessere Internetanbindung
 Nina Hauer: „Hier herrscht großer Unternehmergeist"
 Moderne Technik und bemerkenswerte Architektur – Zelte, die beeindrucken. Die Firma Röder HTS aus Kefenrod

Construction and civil engineering companies of Germany
Companies based in Hesse
Construction and civil engineering companies established in 2001
German companies established in 2001